The Iranian Mosque Hosainia is a Shia mosque Hosainia located near the old Textile Souk in the Bur Dubai district of Dubai, United Arab Emirates. The mosque is also known as "Ali Ibn Abi Talib Mosque" who is the central figure of Shiism. It was originally built in 1979.

Architecture

The mosque is inspired by Persian architecture and is notable for its colorful exterior and interior. It features a facade and onion dome marked with extensive Persian faience tilework, and an azure blue background featured in floral patterns. Islamic calligraphy from the Quran is inscribed in rosettes, amidst swirls in colors of green, yellow, red and white. The mosque has its origins among the city's Iranian community.

Lonely Planet describes it as a "simple yet striking mosque in the textile area of Bur Dubai Souq" and is notable for its "sensuous, bulbous domes and gently tapering minaret."

There is another Iranian Mosque in Satwa which is also a Shia mosque inspired by similar elements.

See also
 Shia Islam in the United Arab Emirates

Notes

References

Iranian diaspora in the United Arab Emirates
Mosques in Dubai
Shia Islam in the United Arab Emirates
Shia mosques in the United Arab Emirates
Mosque buildings with domes
Mosques completed in 1979
1979 establishments in the United Arab Emirates